A series of by-elections were held in Kenya on 11 and 12 June 1966, becoming known as the "little general election". They followed the defection of 29 members of the Kenya African National Union (KANU) to establish the Kenya People's Union. As a result, the KANU government passed a constitutional amendment to force the MPs to seek re-election. Although the KPU received the most votes in the by-elections, KANU won more seats.

Results

House of Representatives

Senate

References

1966 in Kenya
Elections in Kenya
Kenya
By-elections in Kenya
Election and referendum articles with incomplete results